Tallis may refer to:

People
Tallis (name)
Often Thomas Tallis ( – 1585). English composer

Arts, entertainment, and media

Fictional entities
Tallis, a world in Kathy Tyers' Firebird series
Tallis family (Briony, Cecilia, Emily, Jack and Leon), a fictitious wealthy family central to the plot of Atonement
Canon Tallis, a recurring character in both the "Kairos" and "Chronos" series by Madeleine L'Engle
Tallis, a character in the Dragon Age media franchise

Music
Tallis, a rock band formed by former Jethro Tull members John Evan and David Palmer
Tallis Festival, a choral event hosted in London every 12 to 18 months
 The Tallis Scholars, British early music ensemble named after Thomas Tallis
 Thomas Tallis, 16th century English choral composer, regarded as one of the greatest composers in English history

Other arts, entertainment, and media
 Tallis, a publishing company formed by Edgar Wallace to promote his novel The Four Just Men
Tallis Directory, a gazetteer of Gravesend, England published in 1839

Other uses
Thomas Tallis School in Greenwich, London, England
Tallit, a Jewish religious garment

See also
Talis (disambiguation)